Alf Erik Holger Crafoord (born Lundquist; 25 July 1908 – 21 May 1982) was a Swedish industrialist and patron. He founded Gambro, which developed and commercialized the artificial kidney.

Biography 
Holger Crafoord was born in Stockholm, the son of Alfred Lundquist (1882–1927), an army officer, and Hanna Lundquist née Johansson (1883–1965). The marriage is said to have been short-lived, and Hanna Lundquist supported herself and her son in meager circumstances as the proprietor of a grocery store. She later remarried ship engineer Harry Crafoord (1881–1935), who adopted her stepson. Crafoord attended Palmgrenska samskolan and Östra Real in Stockholm growing up.

After graduating from the Stockholm School of Economics in 1930, Crafoord started working at Ruben Rausing's  the same year. In 1935, Crafoord married Anna-Greta Crafoord née Löfdal (1914–1994) and they had three daughters: Birgitta, Katarina, and Margareta.

Crafoord was the director of  paper mill for a number of years. He was involved in a number of organizations, including as a board member of the Association of Swedish Lithographic Printers, head of a paper packaging employers' association, head of the Cultural History Society, and head of the board of a bank.

At Åkerlund & Rausing, he was Managing Director from 1946 to 1968 and Chairman of the Board from 1968 to 1972. During his time at the company, the food packaging company Tetra Pak was established in 1950. By later selling his stake in the company, he freed up a considerable amount of capital which he could use to build up the international company Gambro.

Crafoord suffered from asthma and severe rheumatoid arthritis for a number of years.

In 1982, he died in Lund of sepsis. He is buried at Ödestugu cemetery in Jönköping Municipality.

Gambro 
Professor Nils Alwall had been working since the 1940s on an artificial kidney and dialysis treatments to filter the blood of kidney patients. The filters of the time required a long cleaning process to render them suitable for reuse. In 1961, after being unable to help two patients due to these limitations, Alwall happened to meet Crafoord at a dinner. What Alwall needed was someone to produce disposable filters; Crafoord had experience in the manufacturing and plastics industry and was very interested in financing the product, which could save lives. In 1964, Crafoord founded the company Gambro – originally  AB – which developed and three years later commercialized the invention.

In 1981, Gambro "diversified into the heart-lung product area and built up a special network of suppliers", developing other technologies for treating blood outside the body (extracorporeally), for example in connection with heart surgery, and blood component technology, which separates blood into different components and then uses some of them in the care of cancer patients.

Crafoord Foundation and Prize 
He was the founder of the Holger Crafoord Economics Center in Lund, which later became the Lund University School of Economics and Management.

Awards 
In 1972 Crafoord was awarded an honorary doctorate in economics and in 1976 an honorary doctorate in medicine from Lund University.

  Commander Grand Cross of the Order of the Polar Star (KmstkNO, 3 December 1974)
 Member of the Society of Sciences in Lund (LVSL)
 Awarded Illis quorum in 1982

References

Further reading 
 

Businesspeople from Stockholm
Stockholm School of Economics alumni
1982 deaths
1908 births
Lund University
20th-century Swedish businesspeople
Recipients of the Illis quorum